Gaon (gā'ōn) (plural  geonim — gĕ'ōnīm) may have originated as a shortened version of "Rosh Yeshivat Ge'on Ya'akov", although there are alternative explanations. In Ancient Hebrew, it referred to arrogance and haughty pride ( – "I abhor the pride of Jacob and detest his fortresses; I will deliver up the city and everything in it.") and later became known as a general term for pride, both the positive and negative forms ('Pride [of]'; Late Medieval and Modern Hebrew for 'genius'). Today, it may refer to:

One of the Geonim during the period 589–1040. Prominent Geonim include:
 Yehudai Gaon (Gaon 757–761)
 Sar Shalom Ben Boaz (Gaon 838–848)
 Natronai ben Hilai, Gaon of Sura (Gaon to 857)
 Amram Gaon, Gaon of Sura (Gaon 857–875)
 Saadia Gaon (882/892 – 942)
 Zemah ben Hayyim (Gaon 889–895)
 Sherira Gaon (906–1006)
 Samuel ben Hofni (died 1034)
 Hai Gaon (939–1038)

An honorific title given to a few leading rabbis of other countries in the same period, such as:
 Achai Gaon (?-753-?)
 Nissim Gaon (990–1062)

Specific rabbis of later periods, called "gaon":
 The Vilna Gaon (1720–1797)
 The Rogatchover Gaon (1858–1936)
 The Steipler Gaon (1899–1985)

Many great rabbis, although not formally referred to as the "Gaon of ..." are often lauded with this honorific as both a mark of respect and a means to indicate their greatness in the field of Torah learning, for example, one may refer to Rabbi Ovadia Yosef as "HaGaon Rabbi Ovadia Yosef".

See also
 Genius (disambiguation)

References

Hebrew language
Orthodox rabbinic roles and titles